Black Glitter is the second studio album by Suffrajett. It was released on January 1, 2007 on Cobra Music Records.

Track listing
"Down And Out"
"Like You Better"
"Closer"
"Hurt Your Head"
"Jesus, Driving High"
"Mr. Man"
"Shake Your Heart"
"So Tired"
"Tricky Love" 
"Anybody Listening"
"Getcha' Good"

2007 albums
Suffrajett albums